Local elections were held in Scotland on Thursday 3 May 1984, to elect members to all 53 district councils under the Local Government (Scotland) Act 1973, which had established the two-tier system of regions and districts. This was the first election to take place after the 1983 general election landslide victory for the Conservatives. The local elections resulted in the Labour Party taking control of the City of Edinburgh for the first time.

National results

|-
!colspan=2|Parties
!Votes
!Votes %
!Wards
|-
| 
|
|45.7
|545
|-
| 
|
|21.4
|189
|-
| 
|
|12.8
|78
|-
| 
|
|11.7
|59
|-
| 
|
|6.8
|267
|-
| style="width: 10px" bgcolor=|
| style="text-align: left;" scope="row" | Other
|
|
|
|-
!colspan=2|Total
! 
!n/a 
!~1158
|}

Results by council area
The numbers of seats on each council before and after the election were as follows:

Borders

Central

Dumfries and Galloway

Fife

‡ New ward boundaries

Grampian

Highland

‡ Changes in ward boundaries

Lothian

‡ Changes in ward boundaries

Strathclyde

‡ New ward boundaries.

Tayside

References

 
1984
May 1984 events in the United Kingdom